Zhu Zhengyu (born 12 January 1995) is a Chinese footballer who currently plays for Wuxi Wugou in China League Two.

Club career
Zhu Zhengyu joined Shanghai Shenhua's youth academy in 2006 and moved to Shaanxi Renhe (Guizhou Renhe) in 2008. He was sent to Portugal following Chinese Football Association 500.com Stars Project in the end of 2011 and received training with Greater Lisbon clubs Oeiras and Sacavenense successively between 2011 and 2013. He returned to China in 2013 for 2013 National Games of China. Zhu started his professional football career in 2014 when he joined China League Two side Taiyuan Zhongyou Jiayi. He scored two goals in nine appearances as Taiyuan Zhongyou finished the runners-up of the season and won promotion to China League One.

Zhu signed a contract with Chinese Super League side Shanghai SIPG in the summer of 2015. He was promoted to Shanghai's first team squad by Sven-Göran Eriksson in 2016. Zhu was loaned to Serbian First League side BSK Borča in July 2016. He made his debut for BSK Borča on 5 November 2016 in a 1–0 away defeat against Odžaci.
On 28 February 2017, Zhu was loaned to League One side Nei Mongol Zhongyou for the 2017 season. On 19 April 2017, he scored his first goal for the club in the second round of 2017 Chinese FA Cup against third-tier club Hebei Elite, which Nei Mongol won 2–0. He won the most valuable player of second round title in the vote. Zhu made a trail with A-League side Newcastle Jets in July 2017.

On 26 February 2018, Zhu transferred to fellow Super League side Guizhou Hengfeng. On 11 March 2018, he made his debut for the club in a 3–2 away loss to Hebei China Fortune, coming on as a substitute for Chen Ji in the 68th minute. He scored his first first-tier goal in the match.

Career statistics 
Statistics accurate as of match played 31 December 2020.

References

External links
 

1995 births
Living people
Chinese footballers
Footballers from Zhejiang
Sportspeople from Wenzhou
Inner Mongolia Zhongyou F.C. players
Shanghai Port F.C. players
Guizhou F.C. players
FK BSK Borča players
Chinese Super League players
Serbian First League players
China League One players
China League Two players
Association football midfielders
Chinese expatriate footballers
Expatriate footballers in Serbia
AD Oeiras players
21st-century Chinese people